American Ex-Prisoners of War is a service organization that aims to assist the surviving U.S. military and Civilian prisoner of war (POWs), particularly those who are elderly and those who have medical problems. Based in Arlington, Texas, the American Ex–Prisoners of War was founded in 1942. It received a congressional charter under Title 36 of the United States Code in 1982. The group claims a membership of 12,000 members nationwide.

The group is open to former American POWs of all wars and their immediate families. Its service officers have assisted POW veterans in securing medical services and other entitlements. Former POWs may be eligible for special veterans benefits, including medical care in Veterans Affairs hospitals and disability compensation for injuries and diseases caused by internment. These benefits are in addition to regular veterans' benefits and services to which they are also entitled. Widows and minor children of former POWs may qualify for special benefits and compensation.

Notable members include Wilburn Snyder, James C. Spencer, and D. C. Wimberly.

References

External links
 
 

1942 establishments in the United States
American veterans' organizations

Patriotic and national organizations chartered by the United States Congress